Bracteacoccus is a genus of green algae, in the family Bracteacoccaceae.

Genera
, AlgaeBase accepted the following species:
Bracteacoccus aerius H.W.Bischoff & Bold
Bracteacoccus aggregatus Tereg
Bracteacoccus anomalus (E.J.James) R.C.Starr
Bracteacoccus bohemiensis Fuciková, Flechtner & L.A.Lewis
Bracteacoccus bullatus Fuciková, Flechtner & L.A.Lewis
Bracteacoccus deserticola Fuciková, Flechtner & L.A.Lewis
Bracteacoccus giganteus H.W.Bischoff & Bold
Bracteacoccus glacialis Fuciková, Flechtner & L.A.Lewis
Bracteacoccus grandis H.W.Bischoff & Bold
Bracteacoccus medionucleatus H.W.Bischoff & Bold
Bracteacoccus minor (Schmidle ex Chodat) Petrová
Bracteacoccus occidentalis Fuciková, Flechtner & L.A.Lewis
Bracteacoccus polaris Fuciková, Flechtner & L.A.Lewis
Bracteacoccus pseudominor H.W.Bischoff & Bold
Bracteacoccus ruber Novis & Visnovsky
Bracteacoccus xerophilus Fuciková, Flechtner & L.A.Lewis

A further species, Bracteacoccus helveticus (Kol & F.Chodat) Starr, was regarded as of "uncertain taxonomic status".

References

External links

Sphaeropleales genera
Sphaeropleales